Karsten Lucke (born 29 December 1974) is a German politician from Social Democratic Party of Germany. He has been a Member of the European Parliament since 2022. 

He has been mayor of Lautzenbrücken since 2014.

References

See also 

 List of members of the European Parliament for Germany, 2019–2024

1974 births
Living people
21st-century German politicians
Social Democratic Party of Germany MEPs
MEPs for Germany 2019–2024
People from Kiel
University of Kiel alumni
Mayors of places in Rhineland-Palatinate